DNA replication licensing factor MCM7 is a protein that in humans is encoded by the MCM7 gene.

Function 

The protein encoded by this gene is one of the highly conserved mini-chromosome maintenance proteins (MCM) that are essential for the initiation of eukaryotic genome replication. The hexameric protein complex formed by the MCM proteins is a key component of the pre-replication complex (pre-RC) and may be involved in the formation of replication forks and in the recruitment of other DNA replication related proteins. The MCM complex consisting of this protein and MCM2, 4 and 6 proteins possesses DNA helicase activity, and may act as a DNA unwinding enzyme. Cyclin D1-dependent kinase, CDK4, is found to associate with this protein, and may regulate the binding of this protein with the tumor suppressor protein RB1/RB. Alternatively spliced transcript variants encoding distinct isoforms have been reported.

Interactions 

MCM7 has been shown to interact with:

 CDC45-related protein 
 CDC6, 
 Cell division cycle 7-related protein kinase,
 DBF4, 
 MCM2, 
 MCM3, 
 MCM4, 
 MCM5, 
 MCM6, 
 MNAT1, 
 ORC1L, 
 ORC2L, 
 ORC3L, 
 ORC5L, 
 Replication protein A1, 
 Retinoblastoma protein,  and
 UBE3A.

See also 
 Mini Chromosome Maintenance

References

Further reading